Woodside Priory School (commonly known as  The Priory) is an independent, co-educational, Benedictine Catholic, college-preparatory, day and boarding school in Portola Valley, California, United States. It is located within the Roman Catholic Archdiocese of San Francisco and is thirty minutes from San Francisco to the north and San Jose to the south.

History

The Priory was founded in 1957 by a group of seven Hungarian Benedictine Monks from Saint Martin's Archabbey in Pannonhalma, Hungary. In 1974, the monks affiliated with Saint Anselm Abbey in Goffstown, New Hampshire.

Originally the school was made up entirely of all-male boarders, but over the years the ratio of boarders to day students changed, and today the boarding school accounts for a smaller percentage of the upper school student body. In the early 1990s, the school began admitting females to the day program, with the first coed senior class graduating in 1995. The Priory's boarding program was expanded to include girls in 2004.

The Priory was granted a seven-year accreditation by the Western Association of Schools and Colleges (WASC), the California Association of Independent Schools (CAIS) and the Western Catholic Education Association in June, 2019.

They currently have three active Monks as of March, 2022

Athletics
The Priory offers football, cross country, volleyball, tennis, water polo, soccer, basketball, lacrosse, swimming, track and field, and baseball. In 2000, the girls' volleyball team won the state championship for Division V.

The school competes in Central Coast Section (CCS) post-season competition.

References

External links
 

Benedictine secondary schools
Catholic secondary schools in California
Catholic boarding schools in the United States
High schools in San Mateo County, California
Educational institutions established in 1957
1957 establishments in California
Private middle schools in California
Private high schools in California